Mariléia dos Santos (born 19 November 1963), commonly known as Michael Jackson, is a Brazilian former footballer who played as a striker for the Brazil women's national football team.

Early life
Mariléia dos Santos had 10 siblings, and they all liked football, making her choose the sport. The nickname Michael Jackson was an homage to the recording artist, used by her teammates and given by television commentator Luciano do Valle. Speaking in May 1999, United States player Julie Foudy did not see much resemblance: "She didn't really look like Michael Jackson, but she did wear one glove."

Career
Michael Jackson began her professional career at EC Radar, and in 1988 she represented Brazil at the FIFA Women's Invitation Tournament in Guangdong, finishing in third place.

After her appearance with Brazil in the 1995 FIFA Women's World Cup, Michael Jackson accepted a contract offer from Italian Serie A club Torino.

Michael Jackson played for the Brazil women's national football team at the 1995 FIFA Women's World Cup, as well as at the Olympic debut of women's football at the 1996 Olympics.

Retirement
Michael Jackson retired from playing aged 46, with a reported 1574 goals to her credit. In 2011, she took a job at a newly created woman's football division of the Brazilian Ministry of Sports, helping develop more tournaments for the mostly neglected female version.

She was named equal third in the International Federation of Football History & Statistics (IFFHS) South America's best Women's Footballer of the Century list.

References

External links
 

1963 births
Living people
Sportspeople from Rio de Janeiro (state)
Brazilian women's footballers
Olympic footballers of Brazil
Footballers at the 1996 Summer Olympics
Expatriate women's footballers in Italy
Serie A (women's football) players
1995 FIFA Women's World Cup players
Brazil women's international footballers
Brazilian expatriate women's footballers
EC Radar players
Women's association football forwards
Torino Women A.S.D. players
People from Valença, Rio de Janeiro
Sport Club Internacional (women) players
Brazilian expatriate sportspeople in Italy
Saad Esporte Clube (women) players
CR Vasco da Gama (women) players
Sport Club Corinthians Paulista (women) players
Santos FC (women) players